American singer and songwriter Norah Jones has released eight solo studio albums, seven collaborative studio albums, 4 compilation albums, five extended plays, 23 singles, and three live DVDs on Blue Note Records. Her most recent studio album, Pick Me Up Off the Floor, was released on June 12, 2020, through Blue Note Records.

In 2002, Jones released her solo debut Come Away with Me, which was a fusion of jazz with country, blues, folk and pop. It was certified diamond, selling over 27 million copies and produced three commercially released singles. The record earned Jones five Grammy Awards, including the Album of the Year, Record of the Year, and Best New Artist. Her subsequent studio albums—Feels Like Home (2004), Not Too Late (2007), and The Fall (2009) all gained platinum status, selling over a million copies each. They were also generally well received by critics. Jones's fifth studio album, Little Broken Hearts, was released on April 27, 2012; her sixth, Day Breaks, was released on October 7, 2016. Her seventh studio album, Pick Me Up Off the Floor, was released on June 12, 2020.

Norah Jones has sold over 50 million albums worldwide, over 19 million of the albums were sold in the US.

Albums

Studio albums

Live albums

Collaborative studio albums

Compilation albums

Extended plays

Video albums

Albums as part of other groups
Butterflies (as a member of Laszlo; Released: 1999; Label: Self-released)
Wax Poetic (as a member of Wax Poetic; Released: March 14, 2000; Label: Nablu)
Nablu Sessions (as a member of Wax Poetic; Released: March 14, 2003; Label: Nablu)
The Little Willies (as a member of The Little Willies; Released March 7, 2006; Label: Milking Bull)
El Madmo (as a member of El Madmo; Released: May 20, 2008; Label: Team Love)
For the Good Times (as a member of The Little Willies; Released January 6, 2012; Label: Milking Bull)
No Fools, No Fun (as a member of Puss n Boots; Released: July 15, 2014; Label: Blue Note)
Sister (as a member of Puss n Boots; Released: February 14, 2020; Label: Blue Note)
Dear Santa EP (as a member of Puss n Boots; Released: October 25, 2019; Label: Blue Note)

Singles

Guest singles

Other charted songs

Other appearances

Guest appearances

Music videos

References

Discographies of American artists
Soul music discographies
Vocal jazz discographies
Discography